Akdağmadeni halay is a folk dance and a type of Halay danced by Turks, Anatolian and Pontic Greeks.

Original form
The original form of the dance was popular in Akdağmadeni .

See also
Kaşık Havası
Ballos
Syrtos

References

Turkish music
Turkish folk dances
Year of song unknown
Songwriter unknown